Charles E. Pittman (born March 23, 1958) is a retired American professional basketball player. Born in Rocky Mount, North Carolina, he was a 6'8" 220 lb forward.

After playing collegiately for University of Maryland, he was selected in the 3rd round (61st overall) of the 1982 NBA Draft by the Phoenix Suns. He played for the Suns from 1982 to 1986 for a total of 234 games (14.1 MPG, 4.5 PPG and 3.1 RPG). Later he played professionally in Italy for Divarese Varese (1986–89) and Filodoro Brescia (Serie A2, 1989–91, also known as Telemarket Brescia). 1992-94 Okapi Aalstar (Belgium)
He finished his career with Élan Sportif Chalonnais (1994–1998).

References

1958 births
Living people
African-American basketball players
American expatriate basketball people in Belgium
American expatriate basketball people in France
American expatriate basketball people in Italy
American expatriate basketball people in Spain
American expatriate basketball people in Switzerland
American men's basketball players
Askatuak SBT players
Basketball players from North Carolina
BBC Aalstar players
Billings Volcanos players
Élan Chalon players
Junior college men's basketball players in the United States
Lugano Tigers players
Maryland Terrapins men's basketball players
Pallacanestro Varese players
Phoenix Suns draft picks
Phoenix Suns players
Power forwards (basketball)
Sportspeople from Rocky Mount, North Carolina
21st-century African-American people
20th-century African-American sportspeople